

R
 RABU - Rabanco Companies
 RACN - Raccoon River Railroad
 RACU - Acciona Logistica
 RACX - General Electric Rail Services Corporation
 RACX - Union Tank Car Company (child mark of UTCX)
 RAEU - Reach America Esg Ltd
 RAFU - Oxitec S R L
 RAFX - Rose Acre Farms Inc
 RAGU - Rabanco Companies (child mark of RABU)
 RAHU - IGL Limited
 RAIL - Railinc Corporation (Switch Terminal Carrier)
 RAIU - Rainbow Containers Gmbh
 RAIX - Union Carbide Corporation (Subsidiary of Dow Chemical Company USA, child mark of UCFX)
 RAJX - Rail Logix Alamo Junction, LLC (Elmendorf, Texas)
 RALU - Royal Arctic Line A/S
 RALX - Radnor Rail Ltd
 RAMX - RailAmerica
 RAMX - Rail Merchants International
 RANU - Rabanco Companies (child mark of RABU)
 RAPX - Rapco Transportation Company
 RARW - Rarus Railway Company (Class 3 Railroad)
 RASU - Raseef Containers Services LLC
 RASX - C A Rasmussen
 RATU - Royal Atlantic LLC
 RATX - Railtex Service Co Inc
 RAVU - Flex Box Limited
 RAWX - Platte River Power Authority
 RAX  - RPI-AAR Cooperative Test Program
 RAX - Railroad Passenger Car Numbering Bureau (Shop Mark)
 RBBN - Burlington Northern Railway
 RBBQ - Burlington Northern Railway
 RBBU - Besed
 RBBX - Ringling Brothers and Barnum and Bailey Circus
 RBCS - Burlington Northern Railway
 RBMN - Reading Blue Mountain and Northern Railroad; Reading and Northern
 RBNX - Fruit Growers Express
 RBOX - Railbox Company; TTX Corporation
 RBW  - Burlington Northern Railway
 RC   - Rosslyn Connecting Railroad
 RCCX - Relco Nevada Corporation (Relco Tank Line Division)
 RCOX - Arco Products Company
 RCRX - Reagent Chemical and Research, Inc.
 RCSX - Red-Corn Scrap Metals, Inc.
 RDG  - Reading Railroad; Norfolk Southern
 RDTX - R.E.D. Technologies, LLC
 RE   - Relco
 RECX - Central Louisiana Electric Company
 REDX - Saudi Research and Development Corporation, Ltd. (REDEC)
 REDZ - REDON Incorporated
 REGX - Regus Industries LLC
 RELX - Relco Nevada Corporation (Relco Tank Line Division)
 RESX - Rescar, Inc.
 RFCX - R&F Coal Company
 RFMX - Robert F. Miller; Caldwell-Baker
 RFP  - Richmond, Fredericksburg and Potomac Railroad; CSX Transportation
 RGCX - Rio Grande Chemical Sales Company
 RGIX - Republic Gas and Utilities Corporation
 RGS  - Rio Grande Southern Railroad
 RGW  - Rio Grande Western Railway
 RHAX - Sulphur Sales, Inc.
 RHBX - R. H. Bogle Company
 RHRX - Rahr Malting Company
 RI   - Chicago, Rock Island and Pacific Railroad Chicago Rock Island & Pacific Railroad LLC (Rock Island Rail)
 RIIX - Reilly Industries, Inc.
 RILX - Chicago, Rock Island & Pacific Railroad LLC/Rock Island Lines
 RJCC - R.J. Corman Railroad/Central Kentucky Lines
 RJCP - R.J. Corman Railroad/Pennsylvania Lines
 RJCW - R.J. Corman Railroad/Western Ohio Line
 RJNX - R. H. Bogle Company
 RKCX - Knox Kershaw, Inc.
 RKGX - River King Coal Company
 RKMW - Chicago, Rock Island and Pacific Railroad (Rock Island) Milwaukee Road directed operations
 RLAX - Rail Logix, LLC (Ameriport/Baytown, Texas)
 RLGN - Mackenzie Northern Railway
 RLCX - RELCO
 RLGX - Rail Logix, LP (Port Crossing/La Porte, Texas)
 RLIX - Rail Link Inc.
 RLK  - Rail Link
 RLKX - R. L. and S. S. Klein
 RLSX - Robert L. Shipp
 RMCX - Reynolds Metals Company
 RMDX - American Refrigerator Transit Company
 RMPX - Progress Rail Services Corporation; Railcar Ltd.
 RMRX - Rocky Mountaineer
 RNDX - ACF Industries
 ROCK - Chicago, Rock Island and Pacific Railroad, Chicago Rock Island & Pacific Railroad LLC (Rock Island Rail)
 ROCX - Rock Island Improvement Company (Rock Island); Rocky Mountain Transportation Services
 ROIX - Shintech, Inc.
 ROYX - TCL, Inc.
 RPCX - Railroad Passenger Car Numbering Bureau
 RPDX - Rapido Trains Inc.
 RPRC - Richmond Pacific Railroad
 RPRX - Railpower Hybrid Technologies Corp
 RR   - Conrail
 RRC  - Respondek Railroad Corporation
 RREX - Rex Railway
 RRLX - Railroad Resources, Inc. (maintenance of way cars)
 RRLX - Rail Logistics Inc. / Rail Logistics LC
 RRMX - Robertson's Ready Mix / RRM Properties Ltd, A California Limited Partnership
 RRPX - Railroad Power Leasing
 RRRR - Rock & Rail Inc.
 RRRX - Rex Leasing, Inc.
 RS   - Roberval and Saguenay Railway
 RSB  - Rochester Subway
 RSLX - RSL Corporation
 RSOR - Riceboro Southern Railway
 RSP  - Roscoe, Snyder and Pacific Railway
 RSPX - Evans Railcar Leasing
 RSR  - Rochester and Southern Railroad
 RSS  - Rochester Subway; Rockdale, Sandow and Southern Railroad
 RSSX - RAILSERV Management Corporation
 RSTX - RSTX, Inc.
 RSUX - Riley Stoker Corporation
 RSVX - RAILSERV Management Corporation
 RSYX - Refined Sugars, Inc.
 RT   - River Terminals Railway
 RTCX - Union Tank Car Company
 RTDX - Regional Transportation District; RTD Bus & Light Rail
 RTEX - Rail Trusts Equipment
 RTLX - Relco Nevada Corporation (Relco Tank Line Division)
 RTM  - Réseau de transport métropolitain
 RTMX - Richmond Leasing Company
 RTPX - Wheelabrator Coal Services Company
 RTTX - TTX Corporation
 RUDX - Ruddy Tank Car Company
 RUSX - US Rail Services, Inc.
 RUT  - Rutland Railroad; Vermont Railway
 RV   - Rahway Valley Railroad; Morristown & Erie
 RVCX - Richter Vinegar Corporation
 RVLX - Reinhardt Vinegar

References

R